Kasungu National Park is a national park in Malawi. It is located west of Kasungu, about 175 km north of Lilongwe, extending along the Zambian border.

Most years the park is closed during March, during the wet season. The park is warm from the months of September to May and cooler from June to August. During the summer months a large variety of birds migrate to the park and bird watching is common between June and September.

Flora and fauna
The vegetation consists mainly of Miombo woodland with grassy river channels, known locally as Dambos. A number of rivers flow through the park, notably the Dwangwa and the Lingadzi and its tributary, the Lifupa, which creates an important spot for hippo surveyal in the park at the Lifupa Lodge. Kasungu is known for its population of elephants although is threatened by poaching. Other animals native to the park include Sable antelopes, roan antelopes, kudus, impala and hartebeest and plains zebra and African Buffaloes. Predators in Kasungu National Park include, hyenas, Cape wild dogs and servals. The South African cheetah was thought to be extinct in the late 1970s.

Since 2005, the protected area is considered a Lion Conservation Unit.

References

External links 
 World Conservation Monitoring Centre

Central Zambezian miombo woodlands
Geography of Central Region, Malawi
Miombo
National parks of Malawi
Protected areas established in 1970
Important Bird Areas of Malawi